The Big League World Series (BLWS) Canada Region was one of five International regions that sent teams to the World Series. The Big League division was discontinued by Little League Baseball after the 2016 BLWS. The region's participation in the BLWS had dated back to 1969.

Canada Region Provinces

Region Champions

Results by Province

See also

Canada Region in other Little League divisions
Little League
Intermediate League
Junior League
Senior League

References

Big League World Series
Canada
Baseball competitions in Canada
Defunct baseball competitions
Annual sporting events in Canada
1969 establishments in Canada
2016 disestablishments in Canada
Recurring sporting events established in 1969
Recurring sporting events disestablished in 2016